Live from Lawrence was the fourth album in the "Fresh Sounds From Middle America" series of compilation albums, and like the previous album in the series it was a collaborative effort by Fresh Sounds Records and the KJHK radio station.

General info
KJHK held a competition called "Quest for Vinyl" for bands that wanted to appear on the compilation.  The "Fresh Sounds" series was originally devised by Bill Rich, of Talk Talk magazine, as a way to promote regional bands nationally. However, in an interview with the Lawrence Journal-World, execs from several independent record companies cast doubt that such an appearance would be a springboard to greater success for the bands.

The organisers of this volume in the series were Bill Rich (Fresh Sounds), Brad Schwartz (KJHK station manager), Sam Elliot (KJHJ faculty advisor) and Michael Bassin (KJHK entertainment coordinator).

Track listing
Side 1:

Side 2:

References

External links

Rate Your Music

1988 compilation albums
Post-punk compilation albums
Record label compilation albums
Fresh Sounds Records albums